Bernard Gaillot, a French historical painter, born at Versailles in 1780, was a pupil of Jacques-Louis David.

He died in Paris in 1847.

His principal pictures are:

Cornelia. 1817. 
St. Martin. (Val-de-Grâce, Paris.) 
Conversion of St. Augustine. 1819. (Notre-Dame-des-Victoires, Paris.) 
Dream of St. Monica. 1822. (The same) 
St. Louis visiting the Holy Sepulchre. (Sacristy of St. Denis.) 
St. Louis bearing the Crown of Thorns. 1824. (Palais synodal, Sens.)
Holy Angels. 1824. (In a Chapel at Lille) 
Dream of St. Joseph. 1824. (Saint-Vincent-de-Paul, Paris.) 
The Assumption. 1827. (The town of Eu.) 
Christ blessing little Children. 1831.

References

 

1780 births
1847 deaths
18th-century French painters
French male painters
19th-century French painters
People from Versailles
Pupils of Jacques-Louis David
19th-century male artists
18th-century French male artists